Tetratheca hirsuta, commonly known as black-eyed Susan, is a small shrub in the family Elaeocarpaceae. Endemic to the south-west of Western Australia, it is not related to other plants known as black-eyed Susan around the world.

Appearance
Tetratheca hirsuta has an erect, climbing habit, growing to between 0.1 and 0.9 (4–36 in) metres high. It has a woody rootstock from which arise multiple rough stems which are hairy at their upper ends. The green hairy leaves are arranged alternately, oppositely or in whorls and measure 0.5–2.5 cm (0.2–1 in) by 0.5–1 cm (0.2–0.4 in). Pink flowers appear between July and December in the species' native range. They appear on stalks around 3 cm (1.2 in) in length and are 2 cm (0.8 in) in diameter. They have five deep pink or purple-tinted petals.

History
The species was first formally described by English botanist John Lindley in 1839 in A sketch of the vegetation of the Swan River colony  The specific name hirsuta is Latin "hairy". The genus name is derived from the Ancient Greek tetra "four", and theke "sac, box" and relates to the four-celled anthers.

Location
Tetratheca hirsuta is found on lateritic gravelly soils in open woodland and heath in southwestern Western Australia, in the Darling, Avon and western Eyre districts.

Cultivation
First cultivated in England in 1843 (as T. rubriseta), Tetratheca hirsuta is rarely cultivated but has horticultural potential, for rockeries. It prefers acidic soils and sunny or part-shaded aspect. Pruning stems to just above ground level can rejuvenate the plant.

References

hirsuta
Oxalidales of Australia
Rosids of Western Australia